She's My Baby is a 1927 American silent comedy film directed by Fred Windemere and starring Robert Agnew, Kathleen Myers and Earle Williams.

Synopsis
After twenty years of marriage, Mary Wilbur and her husband John keep up a pretence of happiness only for the sake of their daughter Bernice. In fact both embark on very unwise flirtations with potential lovers.

Cast
 Robert Agnew as 	Bobby Horton
 Kathleen Myers as 	Bernice Wilbur
 Earle Williams as 	John Wilbur
 Grace Carlyle as 	Mary Wilbur
 Mildred Harris as 	Claire Daltour
 Alphonse Martell as Alphonze Dabreau 
 Max Asher as 	Henry Conrad
 William Irving as 	Chuck Callahan

References

Bibliography
 Connelly, Robert B. The Silents: Silent Feature Films, 1910-36, Volume 40, Issue 2. December Press, 1998.
 Munden, Kenneth White. The American Film Institute Catalog of Motion Pictures Produced in the United States, Part 1. University of California Press, 1997.

External links
 

1927 films
1927 comedy films
1920s English-language films
American silent feature films
Silent American comedy films
American black-and-white films
Films directed by Fred Windemere
1920s American films